Emily Lipp Sirota (born August 7, 1979) is an American politician who is a member of the Colorado House of Representatives from the 9th district in the City and County of Denver.

Political career
Sirota sits on the Energy and Environment committee of the Colorado House of Representatives in addition to being included on the State, Veterans, and Military Affairs Committee. In 2022, Sirota was selected to fill one of the vacant seats on the influential Joint Budget Committee for her next term starting in January 2023. Sirota's policy focus include accessible healthcare, protecting the environment, gun violence prevention and supporting worker rights.

Election
Sirota was elected in the general election on November 6, 2018, winning 71 percent of the vote over 29 percent of Republican candidate Bob Lane. She was re-elected in 2020 and 2022.

Personal life 
Sirota is a social worker. Sirota is married to political commentator and radio host David Sirota. They have two children.

References

Sirota, Emily
Living people
Politicians from Denver
21st-century American politicians
21st-century American women politicians
Women state legislators in Colorado
1979 births